TDH can refer to:
 Terre des hommes, Swiss children's rights charity organisation
 Total dynamic head
 L-threonine dehydrogenase
 Turkey's Change Movement, a Turkish political party
 (+)-Thujan-3-ol dehydrogenase, an enzyme
 TDH (news agency), Turkmenistan